The men's discus throw event at the 1997 European Athletics U23 Championships was held in Turku, Finland, on 10 and 12 July 1997.

Medalists

Results

Final
12 July

Qualifications
10 July
Qualify: first to 12 to the Final

Group A

Group B

Participation
According to an unofficial count, 17 athletes from 14 countries participated in the event.

 (2)
 (0)
 (1)
 (2)
 (2)
 (1)
 (2)
 (1)
 (1)
 (1)
 (1)
 (1)
 (1)
 (1)

References

Discus throw
Discus throw at the European Athletics U23 Championships